The Zayit Stone is a  limestone boulder discovered on 15 July 2005 at Tel Zayit (Zeitah) in the Guvrin Valley, about  southwest of Jerusalem. The boulder measures  and was embedded in the stone wall of a building. 
It is the earliest known example of the complete Phoenician or Old Hebrew script as it had developed after the Bronze Age collapse out of the Proto-Canaanite alphabet.

The flat side of the boulder is inscribed with a complete abecedary, although in a different order to the traditional version. The first line contains eighteen letters (aleph through tsadi), while the second contains the remaining four letters (qoph through tav) followed by two enigmatic zigzag symbols.

Description 
One side of the stone carries the Northwest Semitic (Phoenician) abecedary extending over two lines:

    

Rendered in the modern Hebrew alphabet, this corresponds to the sequence:

  

The very top line of the inscription contain the letters:

This is the given name Ezer.

Other similar ground stone objects have been recovered at Tel Zayit. Their function is uncertain, but "they may have served as mortars, door sockets, or basins of some kind."

Discovery 
The stone was discovered on July 15, 2005 by volunteer excavator, Dan Rypma, during excavations under the direction of Ron E. Tappy of Pittsburgh Theological Seminary at Tel Zayit as part of the archeological excavations which took place during the 1999–2001, 2005, 2007, and 2009–2011 seasons.

The inscription was discovered in situ in what appears to be a tertiary usage as part of wall 2307/2389 in square O19. Like the Gezer calendar, the abecedary is an important witness to the letter forms in use in the Levant in the early Iron Age.

Significance 

The Tel Zayit abecedary adds to the corpus of inland Canaanite alphabetic inscriptions from the early Iron Age and thus provides additional evidence for literacy in the region during this period. While claiming a certain "level" of literacy on the basis of this and similar inscriptions is notoriously difficult, Carr (2008) argued that because "Tel Zayit is... small enough and distant enough from Jerusalem... the presence of this inscription there might be taken as testimony of more widespread writing across more far-flung and minor administrative centers of Judah."

In addition to preserving writing as such, the inscription preserves an ordered sequence of letters, though this differs at points from those of other abecedaries from the Late Bronze and Iron Age Levant. Particularly, waw is placed before he, het is placed before zayin, and lamed is placed before kaph. In this last instance, a large X appears to mark a mistake realized by the scribe himself.

There has been some disagreement as to whether the inscription should be associated with the coastal (Phoenician) or highland (Hebrew) cultural sphere. Consequently, there has been debate on whether the letters should be described as "Phoenician", "Hebrew", or more broadly as "South Canaanite." Tappy et al. (2006) associated the inscription with the early Kingdom of Judah. This interpretation has been challenged on both palaeographic and archaeological grounds.

In addition to the above broad historical concerns, the inscription is significant primarily due to the light it sheds on the development of letter forms in the southern Canaanite interior of the early Iron Age. Because the stratigraphy of the site and the date of the inscription itself are still debated, it is difficult to come to any definite historical or chronologically absolute conclusions.

See also 
Paleo-Hebrew
Gezer Calendar
Biblical archaeology

Notes

References 
Excavation website

 The Zeitah Excavations

Academic books and articles

10th-century BC inscriptions
2005 archaeological discoveries
Archaeological artifacts
Hebrew inscriptions
Archaeological discoveries in Israel